The European Journal of Pharmaceutics and Biopharmaceutics is a peer-reviewed medical journal and the official journal of the International Association for Pharmaceutical Technology. It publishes research on pharmaceutical technology, pharmaceutical biotechnology, and biopharmaceutics.

Abstracting and indexing 
The journal is abstracted and indexed in BIOSIS Previews, CAB Abstracts, Chemical Abstracts, EMBASE, International Pharmaceutical Abstracts, MEDLINE, PASCAL, Science Citation Index, and Scopus.

External links 
 
 International Association for Pharmaceutical Technology

Elsevier academic journals
Pharmacology journals
English-language journals
Publications established in 1997
9 times per year journals